Sara Papadopoulou (born 16 October 1987) is a Cypriot footballer who plays as a midfielder for First Division club Apollon Ladies F.C. and the Cyprus women's national team.

References

1987 births
Living people
Women's association football midfielders
Cypriot women's footballers
Cyprus women's international footballers
AC Omonia players